Gang of Losers is the third full-length album from Montreal band The Dears. It was released on August 29, 2006 in Canada under the Maple Music Recordings label and on October 3, 2006 in the USA under the Arts & Crafts label.

On July 10, 2007, Gang of Losers was announced as a finalist for the 2007 Polaris Music Prize, alongside such other acts as Feist, Junior Boys, and Chad VanGaalen.

Track listing
All songs written by Murray Lightburn. 
 "Sinthtro" – 1:31
 "Ticket to Immortality" – 4:22
 "Death or Life We Want You" – 3:19
 "Hate Then Love" – 4:44
 "There Goes My Outfit" – 3:46
 "Bandwagoneers" – 4:40
 "Fear Made the World Go 'Round" – 3:56
 "You and I Are a Gang of Losers" – 4:57
 "Whites Only Party" – 3:10
 "Ballad of Humankindness" – 4:13
 "I Fell Deep" – 4:56
 "Find Our Way to Freedom" – 4:27

The first 10,000 copies included an unlisted bonus track, "The Highest".

The Australian and New Zealand version contained a bonus disc with four tracks, two which were recorded live at Triple J on June 8, 2006.

 Raise The Dead - 4:03
 The Highest - 3:45
 There Goes My Outfit (Acoustic) - 3:52
 Ticket to Immortality (Acoustic) - 3:43

Personnel
George Donoso III – drums
Martin Pelland – bass guitar
Valerie Jodoin Keaton – synthesizers, orgue, vocals
Natalia Yanchak – piano, synthesizers, vocals
Murray Lightburn - composition, vocals, other
Patrick Krief – electric guitar, additional piano on "Ballad of Humankindness"
Chris Seligman – French horn on "Sinthro" and "Ballad of Humankindness"
Rev. William J. Lightburn – tenor saxophone on "Find Our Way to Freedom"

References

2006 albums
The Dears albums
Arts & Crafts Productions albums
MapleMusic Recordings albums